Todd Ross Whitting (born June 13, 1972) is an American college baseball coach and former player who currently serves as the head coach of the Houston Cougars baseball team.  Prior to his current position, Whitting served as associate head coach for the TCU Horned Frogs under Jim Schlossnagle, where the team made their first College World Series appearance.

Whitting spent all but one of the first 12 years of his adult life at Houston as a player or coach.  From 1991 to 1995 (except for 1993, which was spent at Navarro Junior College), he played second base under Bragg Stockton and Rayner Noble.  He graduated from Houston with a degree in kinesiology.  He served as an assistant at Houston under Noble until 2003, when he left for TCU.

Head coaching record
Below is a table of Whitting's yearly records as an NCAA head baseball coach.

See also
List of current NCAA Division I baseball coaches

References

External links
 Houston Cougars profile

1972 births
Living people
Houston Cougars baseball players
Houston Cougars baseball coaches
Navarro Bulldogs baseball players
TCU Horned Frogs baseball coaches
Baseball coaches from Texas
Baseball players from Houston